Ousmane Sidibé (born 23 April 1985) is a Guinean professional footballer who last played as a defender for Red Star F.C.

Club career
Sidibé spent his early career in and around Paris, with Espérance Paris 19ème, Les Lilas, Noisy-le-Sec, Villemomble and Aubervilliers.

Sidibé played in Ligue 2 for Orléans, Béziers and Paris FC, having gained promotion from Championnat National with both Orléans and Paris FC. He signed his first professional contract in 2016 with Orléans after their successful rise to Ligue 2. He spent half a season in Cyprus with Olympiakos Nicosia in 2019.

In January 2020, Sidibé returned to France with Red Star.

International career
Born in France to Guinean parents, Sidibé won his first international cap for Guinea against Zimbabwe in September 2015.

Career statistics

International

References

External links
 Ousmane Sidibé at foot-national.com
 
 
 

1985 births
Living people
Footballers from Paris
Association football defenders
Citizens of Guinea through descent
Guinean footballers
Guinea international footballers
French footballers
French sportspeople of Guinean descent
FC Les Lilas players
Olympique Noisy-le-Sec players
Villemomble Sports players
FCM Aubervilliers players
Paris FC players
AS Cannes players
US Orléans players
AS Béziers (2007) players
Olympiakos Nicosia players
Red Star F.C. players
Championnat National players
Championnat National 2 players
Championnat National 3 players
Ligue 2 players
2019 Africa Cup of Nations players
Black French sportspeople